Skuodas District Municipality is one of 60 municipalities in Lithuania.

It is the only territory whose Council is using the Samogitian language.

References

Municipalities of Klaipėda County
Municipalities of Lithuania